The Boys' decathlon at the 2017 World Youth Championships in Athletics was held on 12–13 July.

Medalists

Records 
Prior to the competition, the following records were as follows.

Results

100 metres

Long jump

Shot put

High jump

400 metres

110 metres hurdles

Discus throw

Pole vault

Javelin throw

1500 metres

Final standings

References 

2017 IAAF World U18 Championships